The ancient Egyptian Hand hieroglyph is an alphabetic hieroglyph with the meaning of "d"; it is also used in the word for 'hand', and actions that are performed, i.e. by the 'way of one's hands', or actions. (Used as a determinative.)

Iconographic usage

Also used in iconography. Pharaoh Den of the 1st Dynasty used the hand as part of his name: "d + n".

An even earlier usage of hand can be compared to the sister hieroglyph: Hand-fist (hieroglyph). Five fists are held onto a rope bordering a hunt scene on a predynastic cosmetic palette. The damaged Bull Palette from Hierakonpolis is notable since each hand forms the base of a wooden vertical standard, with god-like animals, one standing on top of each!

Rosetta Stone usage as word: "hand"
The Hand as hieroglyphic also forms the word for 'hand' in the Ancient Egyptian hieroglyphic language: "ţet." In line 13, (R-13), one of ten ways for honoring the Pharaoh Ptolemy V was to:
...."and let be engraved the Rank: "Priest of the god appearing-(epiphanous), lord of benefits -(eucharistos-Greek)", upon the rings worn on their hands-(hieroglyph)."

In the 1st half of the Rosetta Stone, (the Decree of Memphis (Ptolemy V)), supplied by the Nubayrah Stele, line N-22, there is use of the Hand-hieroglyph as part of an important word that implies the use of 'hands', or 'action'. In speaking of the district, or town that defiled Pharaoh, and had to be defeated, the town is referred to as: ...(the rebels) "they led astray-(Hand hieroglyph: seţeman-sen) the nomes."

The Egyptian hieroglyph alphabetic letters
The following two tables show the Egyptian uniliteral signs. (24 letters, but multiple use hieroglyphs)

See also

Gardiner's Sign List#D. Parts of the Human Body
List of Egyptian hieroglyphs
Hand-with-droplets (hieroglyph)

References

Budge.  The Rosetta Stone, E.A.Wallace Budge, (Dover Publications), c 1929, Dover edition(unabridged), 1989. (softcover)
Wilkinson. Reading Egyptian Art: A Hieroglyphic Guide to Ancient Egyptian Painting and Sculpture. Wilkinson, Richard H., c 1992. Paperback, c 1994, 2000. Thames and Hudson, (softcover)

Egyptian hieroglyphs: alphabet-vulture-a-to-cobra-dj
Egyptian hieroglyphs: parts of the human body